KwaMashu is a township  north of Durban, South Africa. The name is in honour of Sir Marshall Campbell and means Place of Marshall. KwaMashu is bordered by Newlands East to the south, Newlands West to the west, Ntuzuma to the north, Phoenix to the north-east, Mount Edgecombe to the east and Durban North to the south-east.

Arts
KwaMashu is notable for its lively performing arts scene, which includes Maskandi, hip hop, pansula dancing, dance, drama, football. Through performance the young people of KwaMashu are raising the cultural profile of KwaMashu, aided significantly by the skills, resources and direction of eKhaya Multi Arts Centre for Arts and Performance. Uzalo, a South African telenovela is shot and set in kwaMashu as well as the drama series eHostela that's on Mzansi Magic.

The township also boasts a community radio station at the eKhaya Multi Arts Centre, called Vibe 94.70 FM, which has been in operation for more than 4 years.

Civil Society
The Abahlali baseMjondolo movement is very prominent in the informal settlements and transit camps in the KwaMashu area.  They claim to have membership in K-section, Siyanda A, B, and B5, and in two Richmond Farm transit camps.

Public schools
Bhekilanga Lower Primary
Buhle Higher Primary school
Daluxolo Lower Primary
EThekwini Junior Primary
Dumani Lower primary School
Gugulethu Lower Primary School
John Dube High School
Khethamahle Higher Primary School
Khuphukani Lower Primary School
Kwesethu High School
Mukelani Higher Primary
Mzuvele High School
Ndabazezwe Lower Primary School
Ngazane Lower Primary
Nhlakanipho High School
Nkulisabantu Lower Primary
NqabakaZulu Comprehensive High School
Phakama Higher Primary
Phumelela Higher Primary
Phuthumani Primary
Shayamoya Lower Primary School
Sibonelo High School
Sivananda FET School
Siyanda Mazulu primary school
Thandimfundo Lower Primary School
Thandukwazi Higher Primary School
Tholamandla Higher Primary School
Zakhe High School
Dukemini Lower Primary School
Vuyiswa Mtolo High School
Vilakazi Junior Primary School
Zeph Dlomo High School
Zamokuhle Lower Primary School
Ekusizaneni Higher Primary School
Laerskool Eenheid Primary School

Related Townships
Inanda
Ntuzuma
uMlazi
Chesterville
Lamontville

Notable People from KwaMashu
Pius Langa, former Chief Justice of the Constitutional Court of South Africa.
Henry Cele, actor
Leleti Khumalo, actress
Mandla Langa, poet, short-story writer, novelist, and cultural activist.
Thenjiwe Maphumulo Moseley, comedian and actress
Siyabonga Nomvethe, football player
Jeff Radebe, politician
Zakes Bantwini, musician, record producer
Jacob Zuma, Former President of the Republic of South Africa
Riky Rick, hip hop recording artist and record producer
Nomzamo Mbatha, actress
Deborah Fraser, gospel singer
Siyanda Xulu, football player
Zakwe, rapper
Mzi Khumalo, businessman & mining entrepreneur
Khulubuse Zuma, businessman
Siboniso Gaxa, football player 
Nomonde Mbusi, actress

KwaMashu on film
 2008 film "Kwa Mashu: Still my Home" by director Owen 'Alik Shahadah in conjunction with South African arts centre Ekhaya Multi Arts Centre under K-CAP with Edmund Mhlongo (Executive Producer), based in KwaMashu. The film is about the history of the township.

References

External links
 STILL MY HOME: KWAMASHU

Populated places in eThekwini Metropolitan Municipality
Populated places established in 1950
Townships in KwaZulu-Natal
Suburbs of Durban